Trang Nguyen or Nguyên Thị Thu Trang (born March 2, 1990) is a Vietnamese wildlife conservationist, environmental activist and a writer. She is known for her conservation works in tackling the illegal wildlife trade in Africa and Asia. In Vietnam, she is well known for her book Tro Ve Noi Hoang Da (Back to the Wilderness) and Chang hoang da - Gau (Chang is Wild about Bears). In 2018, at the age of 28, she received an award from Future for Nature, as well as Eco-Warrior from Elle Style Awards. She was also voted as 30 under 30 by Forbes Vietnam and nominated for the Women of the Future - Southeast Asian region 2018 for her contribution in global wildlife conservation. She was also included in the list of global most influential women by the BBC in 2019  and 30 Under 30 Forbes Asia in 2020.

In 2013, Trang was immortalised as an online game character to help raise awareness on rhino conservation. The game attracted over 3 million players within the first two weeks of game launched. In 2018, Trang Nguyen participated in the South African documentary film, Stroop: Journey into the Rhino Horn War. and the US documentary Breaking Their Silence: Women on the Frontline of the Poaching War.

References 

Vietnamese activists
Women conservationists
Wildlife Conservation Society people
1990 births
Living people
BBC 100 Women